The Bath–Granville ministry, better known as the  "short-lived" ministry, was a ministry of Patriot Whigs that existed briefly in February 1746.

On 10 February, with the resignation of Henry Pelham and the Cobhamites, William Pulteney, 1st Earl of Bath, undertook the formation of a ministry with John Carteret, 2nd Earl Granville, the former Northern Secretary. However, it only lasted two days, collapsing on 12 February (even before all the ministers could be appointed), and Pelham was reappointed by the King to resume the Broad Bottom ministry on 14 February.

Cabinet
Below are Bath's appointments before he abandoned the attempt to form a ministry; it does not appear that either Carlisle or Winchilsea actually received the seals of office from the King.

:

Other appointments which had been determined upon but not made, according to contemporary rumour, were:
Secretary of State – The Earl of Cholmondeley
Lord Lieutenant of Ireland – The Duke of Bolton
Master of the Horse – The Duke of Portland
Leader of the House of Commons – Sir John Rushout

Citations

References

 
 
 

British ministries
1746 establishments in Great Britain
1746 disestablishments in Great Britain
1740s in Great Britain